CFRT-FM is a Canadian radio station, broadcasting at 107.3 FM in Iqaluit, Nunavut. A community radio station for the city's francophone community, the station broadcasts a mix of original programming and programs syndicated from other francophone radio networks, including the Alliance des radios communautaires du Canada, Ici Radio-Canada Première and Radio France Internationale.

The station was first licensed by the CRTC in 1993, and signed on in March 1994.

References

External links
 CFRT 107.3 FM
 
 

Frt
Frt
Frt
Frt
Frt
Radio stations established in 1994
1994 establishments in the Northwest Territories